James Cecil Alexander Thomson (17 April 1933 – 10 August 2022) was a New Zealand cricketer. He played in five first-class matches for Wellington in 1953/54. He played for the New Zealand Universities cricket team from 1953/54 to 1958/59, including on their tour to Australia in early 1959, and played Hawke Cup cricket for Manawatu from 1959/60 to 1965/66.

Thomson graduated from Victoria University College with a Bachelor of Laws degree in 1958, and became a solicitor based in Feilding. In 1998, he was appointed a master of the High Court for a three-year term. Thomson died in Nelson on 10 August 2022.

See also
 List of Wellington representative cricketers

References

External links
 

1933 births
2022 deaths
New Zealand cricketers
Wellington cricketers
Cricketers from Napier, New Zealand
Victoria University of Wellington alumni
New Zealand lawyers